is a Japanese novel series written by Mado Nozaki and illustrated by Zain. A manga adaptation by Nobuhide Takishita was published in 2019, and an anime television series adaptation by Revoroot aired from October 6, 2019 to January 27, 2020 which was streamed worldwide on Amazon Video.

Plot
Zen Seizaki is a public prosecutor in the newly created Shiniki district west of Tokyo which is a testing ground for a new nation. He investigates a pharmaceutical company promoting a defective drug following reports of falsified test results by university labs. During the investigation, Shin Inaba, an anesthetist is found dead and a bloodstained document is discovered, which includes hair and skin, covered with letter "F". Seizaki's investigation leads to a plot involving the mayoral elections and manipulation of the Shiniki population to embrace a new legislation legalizing suicide. Seizaki discovers that a sinister woman called Ai Magase appears to be behind the push to legalize suicide and is causing the deaths of all of those who oppose her.

Characters

Public prosecutor at Tokyo District Public Prosecutors Office who leads an investigation into the Shiniki mayoral elections and possible manipulation of the population. When the investigation expands overseas, Zen joins the FBI. In his personal life, he is a married man and the loving devoted father of a little boy named Asuma.

Main antagonist of the series. She is a master of disguise and appears as a number of different women. She uses the unique qualities of her voice to make people to commit suicide, convincing them that ending their lives is "good".

Assistant Police Inspector.

 Young officer in the Tokyo District Public Prosecutors Office who unexpectedly commits suicide.

She is an Assistant Officer who is assigned to Seizaki’s team, and is also the niece of the Kasumigaseki Vice Minister of Justice, Yoshifumi Sekuro. She is kidnapped by Magase, who then cuts her limbs with an axe and kills her by decapitating her.

Head of the Tokyo District Public Prosecutors Office.

A newspaper journalist. A close friend of Zen Seizaki from their college days.

He is the Former Secretary General of the Liberal Justice Party and a middle-aged mayoral candidate.

30 year old successful mayoral candidate who pushes for law reform to legalize suicide.

Zen's wife and Asuma's mother.

Zen and Hitomi's young son and only child.

Media

Novel
Mado Nozaki published the first novel in the series, with illustrations by Zain, under Kodansha's Kodansha Taiga label in 2015. Three volumes have been published .

Manga
A manga adaptation with art by Nobuhide Takishita began serialization on Kodansha's Comic Days website on February 25, 2019 and ended on October 7, 2019. It was compiled into two volumes, both released on October 9, 2019.

Anime
An anime television series adaptation was announced to be in production in March 2018. The series is animated by Revoroot and produced by Twin Engine. Kiyotaka Suzuki directs the series, while Keisuke Goto provides the series' character designs, and Yutaka Yamada composes the series' music. The series aired from October 6, 2019 to January 27, 2020 on Tokyo MX, BS11 and AT-X, with Amazon Video streaming the first three episodes worldwide.
The third story arc was delayed and resumed on December 30, 2019. The first story arc opening theme song is "Live and let die" by Q-MHz featuring uloco. The second story arc opening theme song is "Inochi food soul" by Q-MHz featuring Mikako Komatsu. The third story arc opening theme song is "The next new world that no one knows (blood stained ver.)"  by Q-MHz featuring Namirin. 

On February 11, 2021, it was announced Sentai Filmworks has licensed the anime for a North American home video release and it was released on Blu-ray and digital on May 11, 2021.

References

External links
  
 

2019 anime television series debuts
2015 Japanese novels
Anime and manga based on novels
Kodansha books
Kodansha manga
Revoroot
Sentai Filmworks
Seinen manga
Fiction about suicide
Suspense anime and manga
Webcomics in print